Francisco de Santiago Silva (1926 - February 2, 2008) was a visual artist from Mexico. He is the author of works such as Cosmic Rose. According to those familiar with his work like artist Ruben Amaro Galvez, his paintings reveal the sensitive geometry and visual language of singular originality that meets the geometric rigor with muted color and texture poetry that unifies the other elements: the land that blends their irregularities in the grass. He researched different color techniques and became interested in contemporary materials.He participated in many exhibitions.
De Santiago’s fame and recognition within the art community largely has its basis in his academic prowess, in addition to his talent as an artist.

Biography

First years
Francisco de Santiago was born in the family home on "el Santuario" street in the city of Jerez, Zacatecas on March 26, 1926, just five years before the death of the poet Ramon Lopez Velarde. He was one of 9 children born to his father Don Francisco de Santiago del Real and his mother  Mrs. Eloisa Silva Herrera. It was in Jerez where Francisco took his first steps and also completed his elementary and junior high school. His adolescence was spent in the quiet of the fields on the ranch that was owned by his family.

LIfe as an artist

Studies
When the young Francis arrived in Mexico City at age 19, he heeded the call of the artistic vocation and enrolled in the Academy of San Carlos. This institution had teachers including Antonio Rodríguez Luna and Luis Nishisawa; under their direction Francisco acquired a solid background in different painting techniques and everything related to the arts. The issues related to contemporary painting caught his attention, and from its formative stage define the style of his creations. Francisco de Santiago's work ranges from encaustic painting to oils and most recently acrylics. His work is characterized by geometric shapes and real world objects, as well as its diverse tonal ranges.

Later work
Francisco de Santiago remained active and laborious. His leadership and the fruitfulness of his work have always been recognized and are reflected in the appointments and positions he held. In Zacatecas, his work is exhibited in places like the Museum of Abstract Art Manuel Felguérez and the Municipal House of Culture, where one of the rooms that form his name.

Gallery

Notes

References

External links
 http://www.jornada.unam.mx/2008/02/03/index.php?section=cultura&article=a07n2cul
 http://www.oem.com.mx/oem/notas/n583282.htm
 http://www.oem.com.mx/esto/notas/n581303.htm

1926 births
2008 deaths
Mexican artists
People from Zacatecas